The following is a list of notable events and releases that happened in Scandinavian music in 2019. (Go to last year in Scandinavian music or next year in Scandinavian music.)

Events

January
 10 – The 18th All Ears festival opens in Oslo, Norway, running until 12 January.
 25-3 February – The 32nd Nordlysfestivalen is held in Tromsø. Performers include Dmitry Shishkin and Wenche Myhre.
 31
 The 8th Bodø Jazz Open Vinterjazz opens in Bodø, Norway, running until 2 February.
 The 21st Polarjazz Festival opens in Longyearbyen, Svalbard, running until 3 February.

February
 14 – The annual Ice Music Festival opens in Finse, Norway, running until 16 February. Performers include Maria Skranes, Ivar Kolve and Snorre Bjerck.
 23 – At the 49th Dansk Melodi Grand Prix final, held at the Jyske Bank Boxen in Herning Leonora emerges as overall winner with the song "Love Is Forever"; she thus becomes Denmark's representative in this year's Eurovision Song Contest.

March
 6 – The 50th Turku Jazz Festival opens in Åbo, Finland, running until 10 March.
 9 
Melodifestivalen 2019 concludes at the Friends Arena in Stockholm, with John Lundvik emerging as overall winner with the song "Too Late for Love"; he thus becomes Sweden's representative in this year's Eurovision Song Contest.
The 6th Faroese Music Awards ceremony takes place at the Nordic House (Norðurlandahúsið), Tórshavn. Teitur Lassen wins Best Artist and Best Song.
 22 – The Blue House Youth Jazz Festival opens in Stockholm, Sweden, running until 24 March.
 28 – Icelandic band Sigur Rós are charged with tax evasion, covering the period 2011-2014.

April
 4 – Wisting, Norway's most expensive TV series to date, is launched, with music by Jacob Groth, Ole Bo, and Sören Möller.
 12 – The Finnish Radio Symphony Orchestra (FRSO) announces that Hannu Lintu's term as chief conductor will end with the 2020-2021 season.
 30 – Seoul Philharmonic Orchestra announces that Finnish conductor Osmo Vänskä has signed a three-year contract to be its next musical director, beginning from January 2020.

May
 2 – The Finnish Radio Symphony Orchestra names Nicholas Collon as its next chief conductor, to replace Hannu Lintu; Collon will be the first non-Finnish conductor ever to be chief conductor of the FRSO.
 9 – Finnish National Opera and Ballet names Hannu Lintu as its next chief conductor; Lintu will hold the post from 1 January 2022 to 30 June 2026.
 18 – In the final of the Eurovision Song Contest 2019, Sweden finish in 5th place, Norway in 6th place, Iceland in 10th place and Denmark in 12th place. Finland did not reach the final. The UK entry, written by Sweden's John Lundvik, finishes in last place.
 22 – The UK's Philharmonia Orchestra names Finnish conductor Santtu-Matias Rouvali as its next principal conductor, as from the 2021-2022 season, with an initial contract of 5 years.

June 
 12 
 The Iceland Symphony Orchestra announces that Eva Ollikainen will be its next chief conductor and artistic advisor, the first female conductor ever to take on the role; her contract will be from the 2020-2021 season until 2024.
The Bergenfest music festival opens in Bergen, Norway, running until 15 June. The line-up includes Patti Smith and Robert Plant.
 13 – The Norwegian Wood music festival opens in Oslo, Norway, running until 15 June.

July 
 4 
The 20th Folk music festival of Siglufjordur opens in Siglufjordur, Iceland, running until 8 July.
The 23rd Skånevik Bluesfestival opens in Skånevik, Norway, running until 6 July.
 5 
 The Baltic Jazz Festival opens in Dalsbruk, Finland, running until 7 July.
 The 41st Copenhagen Jazz Festival opens in Copenhagen, Denmark, running until 14 July.

August
 6 – The 20th Øyafestivalen opens in Oslo, Norway, running until 10 August.
 8 – The 33rd Sildajazz opens in Haugesund, Norway, running until 9 August.
 11 – The 34th Oslo Jazzfestival opens in Oslo, Norway, running until 17 August.

September
 5 – The 20th Sibelius Festival opens in Lahti, Finland, running until 8 September. Performers include Karita Mattila, Folke Gräsbeck, and the Royal Stockholm Philharmonic Orchestra.

October
 3 – The Norrköping Symphony Orchestra names Karl-Heinz Steffens as its next principal conductor and artistic advisor, beginning from the 2020-2021 season.
 4 – The Copenhagen Opera Festival names Amy Lane as its new festival director; she will be the first woman and the first non-Dane to hold the post.
 18 – Hildur Guðnadóttir wins the Best Television Composer award at the World Soundtrack Awards for her score for the HBO/Sky series Chernobyl.

December
 15 – Finnish band Children of Bodom play their last show before disbanding, at the Black Box venue in Helsinki.
 25 – Swedish musical film, En del av mitt hjärta, is released.

Albums released

January

February

March

April

May

June

July

August

September

October

November

December

Classical works
 Daniel Bjarnason – From Space I saw Earth
 Sebastian Fagerlund – Nomade
 Anders Hillborg – Sound Atlas

Film and television scores
Ole Bo| Jacob Groth & Sören Möller – Wisting
Martin Horntveth – Twin

Eurovision Song Contest
 Denmark in the Eurovision Song Contest 2019
 Finland in the Eurovision Song Contest 2019
 Iceland in the Eurovision Song Contest 2019
 Norway in the Eurovision Song Contest 2019
 Sweden in the Eurovision Song Contest 2019

Deaths
12 February - Olli Lindholm, 54, Finnish singer and guitarist (heart attack)
26 February - Magnus Lindberg, 66, Swedish musician, singer and composer (cancer)
20 March - Terje Nilsen, 67, Norwegian singer-songwriter.
26 March - Master Fatman, 53, Danish comedian, film director and singer
27 March - Audun Laading, 25, Norwegian musician, member of Her's (car crash)
5 May - Ib Glindemann, 84, Danish jazz composer and bandleader
19 May - Alfred Janson, 82, Norwegian composer and pianist
10 June
 Ib Nørholm, 88, Danish composer and organist
 Sven-David Sandström, 76, Swedish composer
5 July - Paolo Vinaccia, 65, Italian drummer long resident in Norway
6 July – Thommy Gustafsson, 71, keyboardist of Swedish band Sven-Ingvars
8 August - Erling Wicklund, 75, Norwegian jazz trombonist and journalist.
18 September – Tony Mills, 57UK-born vocalist for Norwegian band TNT (cancer)
2 October  - Morten Stützer, Danish guitarist and former bassist of Artillery, 57
4 November  - Timi Hansen, 61, Danish bassist (cancer)
5 November  - Jan Erik Kongshaug, 75, Norwegian jazz musician and sound engineer
9 December  - Marie Fredriksson, 61, Swedish singer-songwriter (Roxette)

References

Scandinavian
Scandinavian culture